Doris Burke ( Sable) is an American sports announcer and analyst for NBA on ESPN, NBA on ABC, College Basketball on ESPN, and College Basketball on ABC games. She formerly worked as an analyst for WNBA games on MSG, and has worked on New York Knicks games. Burke was the first female commentator to call a New York Knicks game on radio and television. 

Burke played college basketball for the Providence Friars, finishing her career as the school's leader in assists. Honored for her pioneering work, she was selected to enter the Basketball Hall of Fame as the 2018 Curt Gowdy Media Award winner.

Early years
Doris Sable was born on April 11, 1965, in West Islip, New York She was raised in Manasquan, New Jersey, having moved from New York when she was seven years old. The youngest of eight children, she started playing basketball in the second grade. Her basketball idols growing up were Kyle Macy, Kelly Tripucka and Tom Heinsohn.

She played as a point guard at Manasquan High School and was recruited by several eastern colleges.

Collegiate athlete
Doris Burke attended Providence College in Providence, Rhode Island. She competed as a member of the Providence Friars women's basketball team as the point guard for four years. 

During her freshman year, Burke led the Big East Conference in assists. She was a second-team All-Big East player once and twice made the all-tourney team of the Big East women's basketball tournament. As a senior in 1987 she was the college's Co-Female Athlete of the Year.

She left Providence as its all-time leader in assists and as of 2012 was still second in that career category. She was later inducted into the Providence College Hall of Fame in 1999, the fifth woman so honored.

At Providence, Sable earned a bachelor's degree in health service administration/social work and later a master's degree in education.

Personal life
Doris Burke is divorced from Gregg Burke (currently head golf coach at University of Rhode Island), with whom she has two children.

Broadcasting career
Doris Burke began her broadcasting career in 1990 as an analyst for women's games for her alma mater on radio. That same year, she began working in the same role on Big East Women's games on television, and in 1996 she began working Big East men's games. Burke has been working for ESPN one way or another since 1991. She has been a part of ESPN's coverage of the WNBA. And for many years, she was the primary radio and television voice of the New York Liberty. In 2003, Burke was named to ESPN's top men's basketball team working with Dick Vitale on the men's games and began working the sidelines for ESPN and ABC for their coverage of the NBA beginning with the 2003–04 NBA season. In 2000, Burke became the first woman to be a commentator for a New York Knicks game on radio and on television; she is also the first woman to be a commentator for a Big East men's game, and the first woman to be the primary commentator on a men's college basketball conference package. From 2009 to 2019, she served as a sideline reporter for the NBA Finals on ABC.

In 2010, she was featured as the new sideline reporter for 2K Sports's NBA 2K11 video game. She has appeared in each edition since, including the latest in the series, NBA 2K23.

In October 2013, Burke signed a multiyear contract extension to serve as an NBA commentator for ESPN.  On November 13, Burke debuted on ESPN's NBA pre-game show NBA Countdown, alongside analysts Jalen Rose and Avery Johnson.

In 2017, Burke became a regular NBA game analyst for ESPN, becoming the first woman at the national level to be assigned a full regular-season role. Burke replaced Doug Collins, who left ESPN for a job with the Chicago Bulls, but continued sideline reporting for the conference finals and the NBA Finals until 2019. As of 2020, she currently calls the conference finals and the NBA Finals on ESPN Radio, joining play-by-play Mark Kestecher.

Awards and honors
In 1999, Doris Burke was inducted into the Providence College Hall of Fame. In 2003, she received the USA Today Rudy Award as the Best New Face in Sports Television. In the spring of 2004, she was honored with induction into the Institute for International Sport's Scholar Athlete Hall of Fame, and in the spring of 2005 Providence College awarded her with an honorary doctorate degree. In October 2006, she was inducted into the New England Basketball Hall of Fame. The same year she became a member of the North Providence Hall of Fame. In January 2012 she received the Silver Anniversary Award in recognition of her athletic and professional accomplishments from the NCAA. In 2012, she called the Big East tournament and was a reporter during the championship game. Honored for her pioneering work, she was selected to enter Basketball Hall of Fame as the 2018 Curt Gowdy Media Award winner. For their first match of March 2019, the women of the United States women's national soccer team each wore a jersey with the name of a woman they were honoring on the back; Tobin Heath chose the name of Burke.

References

External links
ESPN biography
Interview with Sports Business Daily

1965 births
College basketball announcers in the United States
Living people
Manasquan High School alumni
National Basketball Association broadcasters
New York Knicks announcers
People from Manasquan, New Jersey
People from West Islip, New York
Providence Friars women's basketball players
Sportspeople from Providence, Rhode Island
Women's college basketball announcers in the United States
Women's National Basketball Association announcers
Women sports announcers